Shiva Rea (born 1967) is a teacher of Vinyasa flow yoga and yoga trance dance. She is the founder of Prana Vinyasa Yoga. She is one of the best-known yoga teachers in America, and around the world.

Life

Shiva Rea was born in Hermosa Beach, California, in 1967; her father, liking the image of Nataraja, dancing Shiva, named her after that Hindu deity. She studied dance anthropology at UCLA, completing her master's thesis in 1997 on "hatha yoga as a practice of embodiment". She studied under yoga and tantra masters including Swami Sivananda Saraswati and Daniel Odier.
She practised the vigorous Ashtanga Vinyasa Yoga for ten years, adopting a more restorative style when she became pregnant. She teaches Vinyasa flow yoga, having created her own style called Prana Vinyasa, and yoga trance dance. She teaches in the USA and many countries around the world, touring each year. Teachers are similarly trained in the USA and around the world in 200, 300 and 500 hour courses in her Prana Vinyasa yoga, which claims to combine tantra, yoga, and ayurveda. She has contributed to publications including Yoga Journal and Yoga International.

Honors and distinctions

The author and yoga therapist Janice Gates honored Rea with a chapter of her 2006 book on women in yoga, Yoginis. Rea has contributed invited forewords to Mark Stephens's book Yoga Adjustments: Philosophy, Principles, and Techniques, to Alanna Kaivalya's book Myths of the Asanas: The Stories at the Heart of the Yoga Tradition, and to Lorin Roche's book The Radiance Sutras: 112 Gateways to the Yoga of Wonder and Delight.

She has been called one of America's leading yoga teachers.
The Library Journal described Rea as a "big name" and a "well-established instructor", whose DVDs embodied the "highest production values". In 2009 she created Global Mala Day to coincide with the United Nations International Day of Peace.  The Los Angeles Times described her as one of "yoga's rock stars", and her classes as feeling "more like a multicultural dance session".

In 2007 Vanity Fair called her "the Madonna of the yoga world" in a desert photo shoot; the photographer, Michael O'Neill portrayed her in Dancer pose (Natarajasana) wearing bikini briefs and an outsize bead necklace, with two tigers in a featureless flat landscape. The article said she was "the best-known instructor of Vinyasa flow yoga" and famous for "Yoga Trance Dance". It stated that she visits up to thirty-five countries every year on her teaching tours.

Controversy

In 2017, Bizzie Gold of Buti Yoga published "An Open Letter to Shiva Rea", criticizing her claim to be teaching traditional yoga.

Works

Books

 1997 Hatha Yoga as a Practice of Embodiment, UCLA thesis
 2014 Tending the Heart Fire: Living in Flow with the Pulse of Life. Sounds True.

Videos
 
 2006 Sun Salutations: awakening the flow
 2006 Yoga Shakti
 2006 Yoga Trance Dance
 2007 Fluid Yoga
 2007 Fluid Power
 2007 Radiant Heart Yoga
 2007 Fluid Yoga Spinal Stretch
 2007 Fluid Yoga Standing Strength
 2008 Flow Yoga for Beginners
 2009 Surf Yoga Soul
 2009 Daily Energy - Vinyasa Flow Yoga
 2009 Creative Core + Upper Body
 2009 Daily Energy Flow - Yoga Upper Body Core Stretch
 2011 A.M. Energy Yoga
 2011 More Daily Energy
 2012 Daily Energy Collection
 2013 Yoga in Greece - Deep Lunar Stretch
 2016 Creative Core Abs: Spontaneous Core
 2016 Creative Core Abs: Water Core
 2016 Creative Core + Lower Body - Creative Roots

References

Sources

External links

American yoga teachers
1967 births
Living people